Megachile geneana is a species of bee in the family Megachilidae. It was described by Giovanni Gribodo in 1894.

References

Geneana
Insects described in 1894